Nicholas Michael Scott (born May 17, 1995) is an American football safety for the Cincinnati Bengals of the National Football League. He played college football at Penn State and was drafted by the Los Angeles Rams in the seventh round of the 2019 NFL Draft.

Professional career
Scott was drafted by the Los Angeles Rams in the seventh round (243rd overall) of the 2019 NFL Draft.

Scott made his first career reception on a 23-yard fake punt pass from Rams punter Johnny Hekker in a 37–10 win over the Atlanta Falcons during the 2019 season. Scott was placed on the reserve/COVID-19 list by the Rams on December 18, 2020, and activated on December 22. Scott made his first career interception during the Rams' win at Seattle on October 7, 2021.

Scott became the Rams' starting strong safety in January 2022 after a season-ending injury to Jordan Fuller in Los Angeles' regular season finale. Scott made his first career postseason interception during the Rams' 30-27 victory over Tampa Bay on January 23, 2022. Scott helped the Rams reach Super Bowl LVI where they would defeat the Cincinnati Bengals 23-20 with Scott recording 2 tackles in the game.

Scott was named the starting free safety for the 2022 season. On January 7, 2023, Scott was placed on injured reserve. He finished the season with a career-high 86 tackles, two interceptions, five passes defensed, and two forced fumbles through 16 starts.

Scott was signed to the Cincinnati Bengals as a unrestricted free agent on March 20, 2023.

References

External links
Los Angeles Rams bio
Penn State Nittany Lions bio

1995 births
Living people
Sportspeople from Fairfax, Virginia
Players of American football from Virginia
American football safeties
Los Angeles Rams players
Penn State Nittany Lions football players